Beverly Hills Bordello is a softcore series aired on the Showtime premium cable channel.  It was an anthology series that centered on the fictional Winston Spa located in Beverly Hills.  The spa was a bordello run by Madam Veronica Winston.

The only recurring character was Veronica Winston who was played by Nicole Gian, Monique Parent and Gabriella Hall during the various seasons the show ran.

Episodes

Season 1 (1996)

Season 2 (1998)

References

External links
 

1996 American television series debuts
1998 American television series endings
1990s American drama television series
Erotic television series
Pornographic television shows
English-language television shows
Television shows set in Beverly Hills, California
Showtime (TV network) original programming
Television series by CBS Studios